The 17th Biathlon European Championships were held in Otepää, Estonia from March 2 to March 7, 2010.

There were total of 15 competitions held: sprint, pursuit and individual both for U26 and U21, relay races for U26 and a mixed relay for U21.

Schedule of events 
The schedule of the event stands below. All times in CET.

Results

U26

Men's

Women's

4 x 6 km Relay
The women's relay competition was held on March 4, 2010.

U21

Men's

Women's

Mixed

Medal table

References

External links 
 IBU full results

 
Biathlon European Championships
International sports competitions hosted by Estonia
2010 in biathlon
2010 in Estonian sport